Alcorcón or Alcorcón Central is a station in Madrid. It is on Line 12 of the Madrid Metro. It is located in fare Zone B1. The station offers connection to Cercanías Madrid via Alcorcón railway station.

References 

Line 12 (Madrid Metro) stations
Buildings and structures in Alcorcón
Railway stations in Spain opened in 2003